Bellefonte Historic District is a national historic district located at Bellefonte, Centre County, Pennsylvania.  The district encompasses 296 contributing buildings in the central business district and surrounding residential area of Bellefonte.  The oldest building in the district is the Col. James Dunlop House dated to 1795.  Notable non-residential buildings include the St. John's Roman Catholic Church, Crider Exchange (1889), Temple Court Building (1894), First National Bank Building, W.F. Reynolds and Co. Bank Building, and Pennsylvania Railroad Station.  Located in the district and listed separately are the Brockerhoff Hotel, Centre County Courthouse, Gamble Mill, McAllister-Beaver House, and Miles-Humes House. The Bellefonte Academy and the Bush House Hotel were previously listed on the register until they burned to the ground in 2004 and 2006, respectively.

It was added to the National Register of Historic Places in 1977.

References

Georgian architecture in Pennsylvania
Italianate architecture in Pennsylvania
Second Empire architecture in Pennsylvania
Historic districts in Centre County, Pennsylvania
Historic districts on the National Register of Historic Places in Pennsylvania
1977 establishments in Pennsylvania
National Register of Historic Places in Centre County, Pennsylvania